Dr. Elizabeth Connell (November 17, 1925 – August 20, 2018) was an American doctor and proponent of women's reproductive health.

Early life and education
Connell was born in Springfield, Massachusetts, to college professors Homer and Margaret Bishop. She got her medical degree from University of Pennsylvania in 1951 beginning her career as a general practitioner in Blue Hill, Maine. It was there botched abortions and unwanted pregnancies and the effects they had on the lives of her patients that Connell developed her views. As a result, she trained in surgery, specialising in obstetrics. She moved to New York city to attend Mount Sinai Hospital for her residency and she became part of the faculty at Columbia University.

Career
Connell was an associate professor of obstetrics and gynecology in 1970 with the Columbia College of Physicians and Surgeons. She toured parts of the world assisting in setting up health facilities and talking about women's health. Connell began a media tour in the United States in the 1980s which saw her appear on The Phil Donahue Show throwing condoms into the audience. She also moderated a discussion in Washington including the feminist leaders Betty Friedan and Gloria Steinem. She moved to Atlanta in 1981 where she was part of the department of obstetrics and gynaecology at Emory University. She was an editor of The Contraception Report from 1990 to 2001.

Connell was a scientist who worked on methods of contraception. She wrote three books on contraception and worked as a researcher with the Centers for Disease Control and Prevention. She was known for her work on family planning, women's health and women's equality.

Personal life
Connell married Dr. John Connell but they were divorced in 1970. She then married Dr. Howard Tatum with whom she often collaborated. She had six children and three step children. Her husband died in 2002. She died in Brookdale Cushing Park, Framingham, Massachusetts on 20 August 2018.

Bibliography

Sexually Transmitted Diseases – 1985
Reproductive Health Care Manual – 1985
Managing Patients With Intrauterine Devices – 1985

References

External links 

 Elizabeth B. Connell Papers, 1960-2010 (inclusive), 1970-1990 (bulk). H MS c437. Harvard Medical Library, Francis A. Countway Library of Medicine, Boston, Mass.

1925 births
2018 deaths
American obstetricians
Women gynaecologists
American gynecologists
People from Springfield, Massachusetts